Chang-Ho Choi (Hangul: 최창호, Hanja: 崔昌鎬) (born February 10, 1964 in Seoul, South Korea) is a former boxer from South Korea.

In 1987, Choi became the IBF Flyweight champion with an 11-round KO win over Dodie Boy Penalosa in Quezon City, Philippines. However, he lost the belt in his first defense to Rolando Bohol in 1988.

In the same year Choi unsuccessfully challenged Khaosai Galaxy for the WBA Super Flyweight title, losing by TKO at 0:56 of round 8.

External links
 

1964 births
Flyweight boxers
World flyweight boxing champions
Super-flyweight boxers
International Boxing Federation champions
Living people
South Korean male boxers